Ermengarde ( 1032 – 1083), daughter of Renauld, Count of Tonnerre and Herviz, married William I, Count of Nevers in 1045. She had six children:
Ermengarde (born 1050, date of death unknown), married Hubert I, Count of Beaumont
Robert (1052 – February 12, 1095), later Bishop of Auxerre
William II (1052–1090), inherited grandfather's title as Count of Tonnerre
Heloise (born 1056, date of death unknown), married William, Count of Évreux
Sibille (1058–1078), married Hugh I, Duke of Burgundy
Renauld II (1059–1089), inherited father's title as Count of Nevers.

Her husband William I was the son of Renauld I, Count of Nevers and Hedwig/Advisa of Auxerre, daughter of Robert II of France.

Notes

References

1030s births
1083 deaths
11th-century French women 
11th-century French people